A by-election for the seat of Singleton in the New South Wales Legislative Assembly was held on 14 August 1894 because Albert Gould had been appointed Minister for Justice in the Reid ministry. Such ministerial by-elections were usually uncontested and four ministers were re-elected unopposed, James Brunker (East Maitland), Joseph Carruthers (St George), Jacob Garrard (Sherbrooke) and James Young (The Manning). A poll was required in Bathurst (Sydney Smith), Hartley (Joseph Cook), Singleton and Sydney-King (George Reid) however all were comfortably re-elected.

Dates

Result

Albert Gould was appointed Minister for Justice in the Reid ministry.

See also
Electoral results for the district of Singleton
List of New South Wales state by-elections

Notes

References

1894 elections in Australia
New South Wales state by-elections
1890s in New South Wales